Bicyclus sylvicolus, the white-tipped bush brown, is a butterfly in the family Nymphalidae. It is found in Ghana (the Volta Region), Togo, Nigeria and western Cameroon. The habitat consists of forests.

References

Elymniini
Butterflies described in 1965